In Greek mythology, the Teumessian fox, or Cadmean vixen, was a gigantic fox that was destined never to be caught.

Mythology 
It was said that the Teumessian fox had been sent by the gods (perhaps Dionysus) to prey upon the children of Thebes as a punishment for a national crime. Creon, then-Regent of Thebes, set Amphitryon the impossible task of destroying this beast. He discovered an apparently perfect solution to the problem by fetching the magical dog Laelaps, who was destined to catch everything it chased, to catch the Teumessian fox. Zeus, faced with an inevitable contradiction due to the paradoxical nature of their mutually excluding abilities, turned the two beasts into stone. The pair were cast into the stars and remain as Canis Major (Laelaps) and Canis Minor (Teumessian Fox).

Sources
 Antoninus Liberalis, Metamorphoses 41, with n. 478
 Apollodorus, Bibliotheca 2.4.6
 Corinna (fr. 672 PMG). 
 Epigoni (fr. 4 PEG).
 Hyginus, Poeticon astronomicon 2.35
 Ovid, Metamorphoses 7.762
 Pausanias, Description of Greece 9.19.1
 Suda, s.v. Τευμησία

Notes

References 
 Antoninus Liberalis, The Metamorphoses of Antoninus Liberalis translated by Francis Celoria (Routledge 1992). Online version at the Topos Text Project.
 Apollodorus, The Library with an English Translation by Sir James George Frazer, F.B.A., F.R.S. in 2 Volumes, Cambridge, MA, Harvard University Press; London, William Heinemann Ltd. 1921. ISBN 0-674-99135-4. Online version at the Perseus Digital Library. Greek text available from the same website.
 Gaius Julius Hyginus, Astronomica from The Myths of Hyginus translated and edited by Mary Grant. University of Kansas Publications in Humanistic Studies. Online version at the Topos Text Project.
 Pausanias, Description of Greece with an English Translation by W.H.S. Jones, Litt.D., and H.A. Ormerod, M.A., in 4 Volumes. Cambridge, MA, Harvard University Press; London, William Heinemann Ltd. 1918. . Online version at the Perseus Digital Library
 Pausanias, Graeciae Descriptio. 3 vols. Leipzig, Teubner. 1903.  Greek text available at the Perseus Digital Library.
 Publius Ovidius Naso, Metamorphoses translated by Brookes More (1859-1942). Boston, Cornhill Publishing Co. 1922. Online version at the Perseus Digital Library.
 Publius Ovidius Naso, Metamorphoses. Hugo Magnus. Gotha (Germany). Friedr. Andr. Perthes. 1892. Latin text available at the Perseus Digital Library.
 Suida, Suda Encyclopedia translated by Ross Scaife, David Whitehead, William Hutton, Catharine Roth, Jennifer Benedict, Gregory Hays, Malcolm Heath Sean M. Redmond, Nicholas Fincher, Patrick Rourke, Elizabeth Vandiver, Raphael Finkel, Frederick Williams, Carl Widstrand, Robert Dyer, Joseph L. Rife, Oliver Phillips and many others. Online version at the Topos Text Project.

Greek legendary creatures
Foxes in literature
Mythological foxes
Deeds of Zeus
Metamorphoses into inanimate objects in Greek mythology